Andrea Moda Formula was a Formula One team that competed during the 1992 season. Its founder was Italian shoe designer Andrea Sassetti and the name came from Andrea Moda, Sassetti's company. The team participated in nine World Championship Grands Prix, but despite officially entering two cars for several races, managed only a single race qualification. Thus statistically, and by general perception, Andrea Moda is widely considered to be one of the poorest constructor efforts to take part in a F1 Grand Prix.

Origins
In September 1991, Sassetti bought the Coloni F1 team after it had failed to pre-qualify a car for every single race that year. Coloni's four-year history resulted in 14 starts in 82 attempts. The team had not qualified or pre-qualified for a race since Roberto Moreno started 15th at the 1989 Portuguese Grand Prix – meaning the team had qualified for no races throughout the 1990 and 1991 seasons – while its best finish was an 8th place for Gabriele Tarquini in the 1988 Canadian Grand Prix.

The team hired a number of ex-Coloni staff and a deal was sought with Simtek to run a car which had been designed in 1990 for BMW. Now named the Andrea Moda S921 the chassis was fitted with Judd V10 engines but the cars were not ready for the start of the season.

1992 season
Instead in South Africa Sassetti arrived with modified Coloni C4B chassis for drivers Alex Caffi and Enrico Bertaggia. The team was excluded from the event for not having paid the $100,000 deposit for new teams in the World Championship, Sassetti arguing that it was not a new team as he had simply taken over the Coloni team and not formed a new one but, since Sassetti neglected to buy Coloni's entry to the Championship along with the team itself, the FIA were unmoved. Caffi performed a few reconnaissance laps in the Thursday familiarization session (arranged as the revised Kyalami circuit was new to all the teams) but took no part in any of the official free practice or qualifying sessions. In Mexico the team arrived with all its equipment but the cars were still being built and neither ran.

Following this both Caffi and Bertaggia were dropped for criticising the team's preparation, with Andrea Moda arriving at the Brazilian Grand Prix with the experienced Roberto Moreno and Perry McCarthy (who had previously tested for Williams and would later gain fame as The Stig on the BBC motoring show Top Gear) nominated as the drivers. While Moreno gave the S921 its first competitive run (failing to pre-qualify), McCarthy was refused a Super Licence and did not run. McCarthy finally received his Super Licence for the following round in Spain, but the car only made it a short distance down the pitlane before expiring. Moreno was again unable to pre-qualify. Around this time Bertaggia approached the team again, having found $1m in sponsorship funds. Sassetti wanted him to return in place of McCarthy but the FIA blocked any further driver changes after the team's earlier shenanigans. Bitter at the loss of funding, Sassetti began to ignore McCarthy's entry and concentrated the team's resources on Moreno.

At the Monaco Grand Prix, McCarthy's car was eliminated in pre-qualifying with an official lap time of 17:05.924. Moreno, meanwhile, successfully navigated both pre-qualifying and then qualifying to start the Monaco Grand Prix from 26th on the grid with a 20th on the grid after the first qualifying session on Thursday, retiring after 11 laps with an engine failure. After this progress the team suffered a run of problems which some thought were bad luck and others down to basic disorganisation. In Canada the team was without engines because Sassetti had failed to pay Judd. A motor was borrowed from Brabham allowing Moreno to perform a few laps but he failed to pre-qualify while McCarthy was once again unable to run. Many people had left the team by this stage and the operation missed the French Grand Prix entirely because its truck was stuck in one of the blockades by French truck drivers; every other team had successfully negotiated the blockades. At this point the few sponsors the team had withdrew, leaving Sassetti reluctantly funding the team himself. By now the second car nominally being used by McCarthy was effectively a spare for Moreno and the Brit was receiving ever poorer treatment from the team - at his home race he was sent out on wet weather tyres on a dry track and at the Hungaroring he was only allowed out of the pitlane 45 seconds from the end of the pre-qualifying session making it impossible for him to set a lap time. At this point, Andrea Moda was warned to make a meaningful attempt to run McCarthy's car as a second team entry, or its exclusion from the sport would be considered.

For the Belgian Grand Prix in late August, both Andrea Moda cars were guaranteed entry into qualifying, because Brabham had withdrawn. This reduced the entry list to 30 cars, eliminating the need for a pre-qualifying session. In qualifying, the Andrea Moda cars were the slowest two on track, with Moreno 13% and McCarthy, who suffered a grave accident in his session, 22% slower than pole; neither qualified to race. In the same weekend, Sassetti was arrested in the paddock for allegedly forging auto part invoices.

The FIA World Motor Sport Council expelled Andrea Moda Formula for the remainder of the 1992 season a week later, on September 8, on the regulatory grounds of "(failure to operate a) team in a manner compatible with the standards of the championship or in any way brings the championship into disrepute." Following the decision, the team was refused entry into Monza's paddock for the Italian Grand Prix.

The Andrea Moda name would later then move to CART, sponsoring Euromotorsport in 1993.

Complete Formula One results
(key) (results in bold indicate pole position)

References

External links

Andrea Moda profile on F1 Rejects
Andrea Moda profile on Chequered Flag Motorsports

Formula One constructors
Formula One entrants
Italian auto racing teams
Italian racecar constructors
1992 establishments in Italy
1992 disestablishments in Italy
Auto racing teams established in 1992
Auto racing teams disestablished in 1992